Minnewoc 1892 is also known as Bullen’s Castle because it was built to resemble Anne Boleyn's Hever Castle and it was built in  for George Bullen. The home was built on 100 acres of land in Oconomowoc, Wisconsin. It was built in the style of an English Manor house, but it was razed in 2021.

Background

The land was owned by Julie Lapham who was from the family that founded Carroll College. The home was built for George Bullen, who was a wealthy malt tycoon from Chicago. 1n 1868 Bullen established a malting house in Kenosha, Wisconsin.

The home was named "Minnewoc" which is a native American word meaning "place of waters. There is a natural spring found on the property.

History
The original property stretched for 100 acres. It now sits on 7.2 acres, with  feet of lake frontage and features a private island. The home was designed in the style of Anne Boleyn's Hever Castle in England. It was architectural style is referred to as English Manor House. The home was originally  but in 2013  was added in an addition. The new owners also added solar panels and they put it up for sale in 2017 for 10.5 million USD. It was sold in 2021 for 7.799 million USD in 2021 and the new owners had it torn down the same year.

References

External links
Photos: Minnewoc Mansion in Oconomowoc

Houses completed in 1892
Houses in Wisconsin
Buildings and structures demolished in 2021